Kurt Campbell may refer to:

Kurt Campbell (linebacker) (born 1982), American football linebacker
Kurt M. Campbell (born 1957), American diplomat